The Thunderlords are an American heavy metal band. They describe themselves as "heavy metal for kids."

Career 
The band began primarily as the work of video-game programmer Alan Flores, a native of Los Angeles, with some help from his young daughter, Maya (born 2000).

The 2005 album Noisy Songs for Noisy Kids has charted on children's music charts in the US, Australia and Belgium.

They are known best for their songs "I Like Dirt" and "Ice Cream Headache" on the soundtracks for the bestselling video games Tony Hawk's American Wasteland, Tony Hawk's Project 8 and Tony Hawk’s American Sk8land respectively. The latter game also won the IGN award for Best Licensed Soundtrack on PlayStation 3 in 2006.

Members 
 Alan Flores - vocals, all instruments
 Maya Flores - vocals

Discography
 Noisy Songs for Noisy Kids (Album, 2005)

References

External links
[ Thunderlords at allmusic.com]

Heavy metal musical groups from California
American children's musical groups
Comedy rock musical groups
Musical groups from Los Angeles